
Gmina Manowo is a rural gmina (administrative district) in Koszalin County, West Pomeranian Voivodeship, in north-western Poland.

Villages
Gmina Manowo contains the villages and settlements of Bonin, Cewlino, Dęborogi, Gajewo, Grąpa, Grzybnica, Grzybniczka, Jagielno, Kliszno, Kopanica, Kopanino, Kostrzewa, Kretomino, Lisowo, Manowo, Mostowo, Policko, Poniki, Rosnowo, Wiewiórowo, Wyszebórz, Wyszewo and Zacisze.

Neighbouring gminas
Gmina Manowo is bordered by the city of Koszalin and by the gminas of Bobolice, Polanów, Sianów and Świeszyno.

References
Polish official population figures 2006

Manowo
Koszalin County